Arthrobacter psychrolactophilus is a psychrotrophic bacterium species from the genus Arthrobacter which has been isolated from soil in the United States. Arthrobacter psychrolactophilus produces amylase.

References

Further reading

External links
Type strain of Arthrobacter psychrolactophilus at BacDive -  the Bacterial Diversity Metadatabase

Bacteria described in 2000
Psychrophiles
Micrococcaceae